Phalonidia haesitans is a species of moth of the family Tortricidae. It is found in Minas Gerais, Brazil.

References

Moths described in 1994
Phalonidia